Mitromorpha pinguis is a species of sea snail, a marine gastropod mollusk in the family Mitromorphidae.

Description
The length of the shell attains 8 mm, its diameter 4 mm.

Distribution
This marine species occurs off Japan, New Caledonia and the Loyalty Islands.

References

 Hervier, J. "Le genre Columbella dans l’Archipel de la Nouvelle-Calédonie." Journal de Conchyliologie 46 (1899): 305–391
 Fischer-Piette, E., 1950. Liste des types décrits dans le Journal de Conchyliologie et conservés dans la collection de ce journal (avec planches)(suite). Journal de Conchyliologie 90: 149–180

External links
 

pinguis
Gastropods described in 1900